The Lions Management (The Lions Model Management, LLC) is a modeling agency based in New York City. The company was founded in 2014.

Company history 
In 2014, several models quit their agencies to form The Lions, including Agyness Deyn, Karen Elson and Cameron Russell from Elite Model Management, Jessica Hart, Anne Vyalitsyna and Angela Lindvall from Women Management, and Frankie Rayder from IMG Models. The transfers are mostly due to models following their agents to the new agency. The Lions subsequently restructured under the leadership of new managing partners Ali Kavoussi, Louie Chaban and Christiana Tran with Julia Kisla serving as the agency's CEO.

A few years later, The Lions opened up a division in Los Angeles in 2017. The office was headed by Charlotte Reiss, formerly of Wilhelmina Models, who served as its director. As a result of the COVID-19 pandemic, the company has closed its Los Angeles branch and remains primarily based out of New York City.

In 2020, the company tapped Julie O'Donnell, former director of Ford Models, to serve as one of its co-directors, alongside Nancy Ortiz. The following year, in 2021, the agency began to shift from its primary strategy away from model management to include creative strategy and brand development. The agency was involved in producing advertising campaigns with Tamara Mellon and DHL.

Talent
In addition to primarily managing models in the fashion industry, the agency also maintains a roster of artists, musicians, athletes, and other public-facing figures. As of 2022, talent signed to the agency include:

 Amanda de Cadenet
 Anne V
 Aya Jones
 Candice Swanepoel
 Caroline de Maigret
 Coco Rocha
 Daphne Groeneveld
 Daiane Sodre
 Don Toliver
 Eliza Cummings
 Eva Herzigova
 Frankie Rayder
 Frida Aasen
 Georgia May Jagger
 Gracie Carvalho
 Ilfenesh Hadera
 Isabeli Fontana
 Jamie Bochert
 Jarvis Landry
 Jasmine Tookes
 Jessica Hart
 Jon Kortajarena
 Juana Burga
 Kate Upton
 Kristen McMenamy
 Kristina Grikaite
 Lara Stone
 Leomie Anderson
 Madison Headrick
 Maryna Linchuk
 Michelle Alves
 Ming Xi
 Omar Apollo
 Rita Ora
 Sara Sampaio
 Sasha Luss
 Shanina Shaik
 Sora Choi
 Stella Maxwell
 Tali Lennox
 Toni Garrn
 Valentina Sampaio

See also
 List of modeling agencies

References

Modeling agencies
2012 establishments in New York City
Companies based in New York City